Vennello Hai Hai is a 2016 Telugu drama film starring Ajmal Ameer and Nikitha Narayan in the lead roles directed by Vamsy.
It was previously titled as Tanu Monne Vellipoyindi (translation: She Went Day before Yesterday) and Mellagaa... Tattindi Manasu Talupu (translation: She Knocked the Door of My Heart Slowly). The film was released on 5 March 2016. The film will be dubbed and released in Tamil as Mella Thiranthathu Manasu. The movie is loosely based on Malladi Venkata Krishna Murthy's novel, Meghamala, which was written 40 years before the film was made. The film's title is based on a song from Vamsy's own, Avunu Valliddaru Ista Paddaru! (2002).

Plot
Susheel (Ajmal) is a software engineer working in Mumbai. His parents fix his alliance with Satya(Nikitha Narayan) and ask him to meet her. During this time, Susheel's parents showcase his horoscope to their spiritual guru. To their huge shock, they find out that their son is already married. They reveal the same thing to Susheel who gets equally shocked. Upset with this, he suddenly remembers his childhood days where he married Tanuja during a fun kids game. A curious Susheel now starts looking for Tanuja. Who is this Tanuja? Will Susheel find her? And meanwhile happens to Satya? That forms the rest of the story.

Cast
 Ajmal as Susheel
 Nikitha Narayan as Satya
 Krishneswara Rao

Soundtrack

Release
Vennello Hai Hai released on 5 Feb 2016 across Telangana and Andhra Pradesh.

Critical reception
Indiaglitz wrote "With some better technical inputs and good writing in terms of dialogue, the film could have scraped through." 123 Telugu wrote "One of the biggest drawbacks of the film is the boring and outdated narration. The makers have taken a routine story line and have showcased the film in a beaten to death formula. So, all the scenes and situations which come during this time are below par."

References

External links
 Ajmal Excited About Vamsy's Tanu Monne Vellipoyindi Release at OneIndia.in

2016 films
2010s Telugu-language films
Films scored by Chakri
Films directed by Vamsy